Viking Orion is a cruise ship operated by Viking Ocean Cruises. The ship was built by Fincantieri at its yard in Ancona, Italy. It was delivered to Viking Cruises on June 7, 2018. The ship was christened by NASA astronaut Anna Fisher in a ceremony at Livorno, Italy. The ship was named after Orion the Hunter, a constellation and has the unique feature of a planetarium.

Operational history 
The ship's maiden voyage was a 'shakedown cruise' (not open to the public) which departed from Rome, Italy and ended in Barcelona, Spain. The first commercial voyage departed Barcelona on June 19, 2018.

On January 2, 2023, the ship was asked to leave New Zealand waters due to excess algae and barnacles. The ship was subsequently prohibited from docking in Adelaide, Australia due to the same issues, causing passengers to be stranded onboard. Four port stops were missed. The cruise line hired divers to clean the hull whilst it was in international waters.

References 

Ships built by Fincantieri
Cruise ships of Norway